Mallapur is also known as Mallapuram before (2000's) is a neighbourhood in Hyderabad in the Indian state of Telangana. It falls under Uppal mandal of Medchal-Malkajgiri district. It is administered as Ward No. 5 of Greater Hyderabad Municipal Corporation.

Climate 

Mallapur, Hyderabad has a tropical savanna climate with hot summers from late February to early June, the monsoon season from late June to early October and a pleasant winter from late October to early February. In the evenings and mornings the climate is generally cooler because of the city's good elevation. Hyderabad gets about 32 inches (about 810 mm) of rain every year, almost all of it concentrated in the monsoon months. The highest temperature ever recorded was 45.5 o C (113.9 °F) on 2 June 1966, while the lowest recorded temperature was 6.1o C (43 °F) on 8 January 1946.

References 

Neighbourhoods in Hyderabad, India
Municipal wards of Hyderabad, India